Malediva was a German chanson and cabaret trio, consisting of
 Lo Malinke (born 1970) – vocals, texts, lyrics
 Tetta Müller (born 1970) – vocals, texts, stage design, costume
 Florian Ludewig (born 1975) – piano, composer
All members live in Berlin and performed in Germany, Switzerland and Austria. In May 2014 Malediva cancelled the remaining tourdates for their newest show 'Barhocker' and announced their professional breakup for health reasons.

Topics

Malediva's preferred topics are mainly human relationships and "living in the province". Their lyrics and texts are often based on their own biography, and reflect the relations between the members of the group.

Though Lo and Tetta are a homosexual couple, they claim their sexual orientation doesn't play a role in their performance, as the audience might suspect: during their early performances, they often shifted roles and gender, which had been supported by their androgynous makeup.

Awards 

 Kritiker-Preis der Berliner Zeitung, 2000
 St. Ingberter Pfanne, 2001
 Tuttlinger Krähe, Jury – und Publikumspreis, 2004
 Memminger Kabarett – Preis, 2004
 Deutscher Kleinkunstpreis – Sparte Kleinkunst –, 2006
 Marlene, Publikumspreis des Köstritzer Spiegelzeltes, Weimar 2010
 Wilhelmshavener Knurrhahn, Stadt Wilhelmshaven und Pumpwerk, Wilhelmshaven 2011

Records 

 CD:
 große kundsd, Roof Music, 2000, .
 schaulaufen, Roof Music, 2001, .
 Leuchtet, Roof Music, 2003, .
 Heimatmelodie, Roof Music, 2004, .
 Ab heute verliebt!, Roof Music, 2006, .
 Ungeschminkt, Roof Music, 2008, .
 Lebkuchen, Roof Music, 2009, .
 Die fetten Jahre, Roof Music, 2009, .
 Schnee auf Tahiti, Roof Music, 2012, .
 DVD:
 Malediva Ab heute verliebt!, Alive, 2007, .
 Malediva – DIE FETTEN JAHRE., Roof Music, 2011, .

Sources

External links 
 
 Agency
 MySpace site

Cabaret